Mihai Iștvanovici, also known as "the Wallachian" or Stepaneshvili, was a 17-18th century Wallachian letter cutter, typeface designer, typographer and printer who worked in the first typography in Georgia under King Vakhtang VI of Kartli. Mihai was a native of Transylvania, born into a peasant family that served Hungarian landlords. Mihai was sent to Georgia by Anthim the Iberian upon the request of King Vakhtang VI of Kartli, in order to establish a printing press and typography. He likely arrived in Georgia in 1707. Vakhtang VI wrote in his will, "I brought the printer from Wallachia and made a typography".

Bibliography

Paichadze, G. Vakhtang the Sixth, Tbilisi, 1981
Gvinchidze, O. Anthim the Iberian, Tbilisi, 1973

Romanian typographers and type designers
18th century in Georgia (country)